Ja'far ibn Muhammad ibn Husayn al-Hasani was Sharif of Mecca from the late 960s to the early 970s, and the first Emir belonging to the Musawid dynasty.

He was a Hasanid, descendant of the ninth generation from Hasan ibn Ali. According to Ibn Khaldun, Ja'far came from Medina and conquered Mecca. He ordered the khutbah in the name of the Fatimid caliph al-Mu'izz after the latter conquered Egypt in 969. Although the date Ja'far conquered Mecca is not known, Ibn Hazm writes that it was during the reign of the Ikhshidids in Egypt. Al-Fasi narrows it down to the years 356-358 AH (967-969), since Ikhshidid influence in the Hejaz waned after the death of Abu al-Misk Kafur. However, he does acknowledge that this is contradicted by some chronicles which indicate that Ja'far had Kafur's name pronounced in the khutbah.

The sources provide different dates for the year in which Ja'far captured Mecca: the years 967, 968, 969, and the entire period 951–961 are mentioned. Ja'far founded a long line of Hasanid Sharifs of Mecca, which lasted until their overthrow by the Saudis in 1924. Ja'afar's line, the Ja'farid dynasty, ended with Shukr ibn Abi'l-Futuh in 1061. Medina, on the other hand, was frequently controlled by the Husaynids.

References

Sources 
 
 
 

Sharifs of Mecca
Vassal rulers of the Fatimid Caliphate
10th-century Arabs
Hasanids